Drifting Flowers is a 2008 Taiwanese lesbian drama film by director Zero Chou. The original Chinese title means “The Drifting Waves of Youth.”

Drifting Flowers had its world premiere on February 12, 2008, at the Berlin Film Festival as an official Panorama selection.

Plot 
The story takes place in three acts, and themes of love and abandonment predominate.  Characters deal with lesbianism and gender dysphoria.

Cast and characters 
 Pai Chih-Ying as Meigo
 Serena Fang as Jing
 Chao Yi-Lan as Chalkie
 Lu Yi-Ching as Lily
 Sam Wang as Yen

Critical response 
Variety called the film "the most professionally made of [Chou's] three features to date, but with a weakly developed script that doesn’t plumb far beneath the surface."

The Hollywood Reporter said the movie is Chou's strongest film to date, "yet it still lacks a script strong enough to pull it all together."

AfterEllen said the tripartite story line is "one of the movie’s greatest strengths, as each scene hits the emotional high notes and captures quiet moments with equal aplomb."

Home media 
The film was released in DVD format in Region 1 on February 3, 2009, by Wolfe Video; and in Region 3 on September 10, 2009, by Hoker Records. It was released on Blu-ray in region-free format on July 24, 2009, by Hoker Records.

See also 
 List of LGBT films directed by women
 List of lesbian filmmakers

References

Further reading

External links 
 
 
  Drifting Flowers  at Three Dots Entertainment
 Drifting Flowers at TLA Releasing

2008 films
2008 LGBT-related films
Lesbian-related films
LGBT-related drama films
2000s Mandarin-language films
Taiwanese drama films
Taiwanese LGBT-related films
Films directed by Zero Chou
2008 drama films
Transgender-related films